The 1969 Coupe de France Final was a football match held at Stade Olympique Yves-du-Manoir, Colombes on May 18, 1969, that saw Olympique de Marseille defeat FC Girondins de Bordeaux 2–0 thanks to an own goal by Gérard Papin and a goal by Joseph Yegba Maya.

Match details

See also
Coupe de France 1968-69

External links
Coupe de France results at Rec.Sport.Soccer Statistics Foundation
Report on French federation site

Coupe De France Final
1969
Coupe De France Final 1969
Coupe De France Final 1969
Coupe de France Final
Sport in Hauts-de-Seine
Coupe de France Final